Timothy Joseph Dykstra (born November 4, 1961 in Detroit, Michigan) is an American former handball player who competed in the 1984 Summer Olympics.

References

1961 births
Living people
Sportspeople from Detroit
American male handball players
Olympic handball players of the United States
Handball players at the 1984 Summer Olympics